The Croatia Forum, previously known as Croatia Summit, is an annual international conference held in Dubrovnik, Croatia since 2006 which focuses on Southeastern Europe.

Croatia Summit 2006: Future of Southeast Europe

Hosts
 Croatian Prime Minister Ivo Sanader
 Croatian President Stjepan Mesić
 Croatian Parliament Speaker Vladimir Šeks

Delegates
 Albanian Prime Minister Sali Berisha
 Montenegrin Prime Minister Milo Đukanović
 Romanian Prime Minister Călin Popescu-Tăriceanu
 Bosnian and Herzegovinian Prime Minister Adnan Terzić
 Georgian President Mikheil Saakashvili

Croatia Summit 2007: Europe's New South

Delegates
 Zbigniew Brzezinski
 Noël Kinsella - Speaker of the Canadian Senate
 Mikheil Saakashvili - Georgian President
 Giorgi Ugulava - Mayor of Tbilisi
 Aigars Kalvītis - Latvian Prime Minister
 Nikola Gruevski - Macedonian Prime Minister
 Vasile Tarlev - Moldovan Prime Minister
 Roman Giertych - Polish Deputy Prime Minister
 Călin Popescu-Tăriceanu - Romanian Prime Minister
 Vuk Jeremić - Serbian Foreign Affairs Minister
 Robert Fico - Slovak Prime Minister
 Karl Erjavec - Slovenian Minister of Defence
 Carl Bildt - Swedish Foreign Affairs Minister
 Agim Çeku - Kosovar Prime Minister
 Jaap de Hoop Scheffer - NATO Secretary General

Croatia Summit 2008: Security, Development, Prosperity

Delegates
 Mikheil Saakashvili - Georgian President
 Ferenc Gyurcsány - Hungarian Prime Minister
 Sali Berisha - Albanian Prime Minister
 Hashim Thaqi - Kosovan Prime Minister
 Robert Fico - Slovakian Prime Minister
 Milo Đukanović - Montenegrin Prime Minister
 Dan Fried - United States Assistant State Secretary

Croatia Summit 2009: Europe's Strategic Imperative - Energy, Investment and Development

Delegates
 Nikola Špirić - Bosnia and Herzegovina Prime Minister
 Milo Đukanović - Montenegrin Prime Minister
 Hashim Thaçi - Kosovo Prime Minister
 Miroslav Lajčák - Slovak Minister of Foreign Affairs
 Antonio Milošoski - Macedonian Minister of Foreign Affairs

Croatia Summit 2010 – South East Europe Facing Global Challenges

Hosts
 Croatian Prime Minister Jadranka Kosor
 Croatian President Ivo Josipović
 Croatian Parliament Speaker Luka Bebić

Delegates
 Silvio Berlusconi - Italian Prime Minister
 François Fillon - French Prime Minister
 Donald Tusk - Polish Prime Minister
 Boyko Borisov - Bulgarian Prime Minister
 Borut Pahor - Slovenian Prime Minister
 Milo Đukanović - Montenegrin Prime Minister
 Hashim Thaçi - Kosovo Prime Minister
 Štefan Füle - European Commissioner
 Michael Spindelegger - Austrian Minister of Foreign Affairs
 Miroslav Lajčák - Slovak Minister of Foreign Affairs
 Antonio Milošoski - Macedonian Minister of Foreign Affairs

References

Dubrovnik
Foreign relations of Croatia
Recurring events established in 2006
2006 establishments in Croatia